The Nordic Resistance Movement is a pan-Nordic neo-Nazi movement in the Nordic countries and a political party in Sweden. Besides Sweden, it is established in Norway, Denmark and Iceland, and formerly in Finland before it was banned in 2019. The NRM has been described as a terrorist organization due to their aim of abolishing democracy along with their paramilitary activities, weapons caches and connections to proscribed terrorist organizations such as the Russian Imperial Movement and National Action. In 2022, some members of the United States Congress began calling for the organization to be added to the United States Department of State list of Foreign Terrorist Organizations.

Formation and structure
In December 1997, Klas Lund and some other former members of the White Aryan Resistance (Swedish: Vitt Ariskt Motstånd, also known as VAM) – a militant neo-Nazi network active from 1991 to 1993 – were released from prison after being convicted of robberies, bombings and killings, among other things. They formed the Swedish Resistance Movement (Svenska Motståndsrörelsen or SMR) together with individuals working with the neo-Nazi magazine Folktribunen and members of Nationell Ungdom ("National Youth"), a neofascist and openly racist organisation known for the murder of the anarchist Björn Söderberg.

In 2016, the Nordic Resistance Movement was formed, with separate affiliates in Sweden, Finland, and Norway; a Danish affiliate was later disbanded. The Nordic Resistance Movement advocates an immediate stop to what they call mass immigration to the Scandinavian countries, and repatriation of people that are not of Northern European or of closely related descent. It also advocates Nordic self-sufficiency and withdrawal from the European Union.

On 28 February 2018, The Verge reported that Discord had shut down a number of neo-Nazi and alt-right servers, including that of the Nordic Resistance Movement, from their private chat platform, for abuse of their Terms of Service.

Ideology

The aim of Nordic Resistance Movement is to establish a totalitarian neo-Nazi Nordic State "consisting of the Nordic countries Sweden, Finland, Norway, Denmark, Iceland and possibly even the Baltic countries". The organization itself describes its goals differently: "Although the Resistance Movement strives to create a state with authoritarian leadership, it is also our goal to develop and secure freedom and democracy. The Nordic National Socialist Republic will be a leader state, but it will also be a people's democracy."

The organization says its fight will require bloodshed. The NMR has praised Adolf Hitler and Corneliu Codreanu in their publications. Their main tactics are distributing leaflets and making public speeches in inner-city areas in support of neo-Nazism, denouncing immigration. They also publish the Nationellt Motstånd magazine.

Sweden
The Nordic Resistance Movement  was founded by Klas Lund. It is known for its opposition to non-white immigration to Sweden. The NRM is considered a central actor in Sweden's white power movement.
In November 2003 the Swedish Security Service raided homes of leading members, among them Lund, who was later sentenced to prison for illegal possession of firearms.

In May 2006, the Nordic Resistance Movement announced that the National Youth organisation and all its activities and members had been merged with the SRM. In December 2013, armed NRM members attacked an anti-racist demonstration in Stockholm which resulted in riots and clashes. Many were arrested afterwards. In the 2014 Swedish election, two members of the NRM were elected to Sweden Democrats seats in the municipal councils in Ludvika and Borlänge. In what has been described as a "coup" their names were added to Sweden Democrats' ballots that were open for additions. Late in 2015, the NRM was registered as a political party in Sweden, headed by the organization's spokesman, Pär Öberg.

Three men with ties to Swedish NRM were sentenced to prison for respectively eight and a half years, five years, and one and a half years on 7 July 2017 for three bombings in Göteborg which took place in November 2016 and January 2017. One person received life-threatening injuries at the bombing of a refugee centre in Västra Frölunda. They have appealed the verdict. The men were part of a group of Swedish and Finnish neo-Nazis who went to Russia to receive military training in firearms and explosives from the Russian Imperial Movement. Police also arrested a Russian man connected to the RIM and NRM and confiscated two weapon caches.

On 30 September 2017, NRM staged a march with roughly 500 members taking part in Sweden's second largest city Göteborg, timed to coincide with the annual Göteborg Book Fair. Fighting broke out between NRM and counterdemonstrators. Twenty-two NRM members including the organisation's leader Simon Lindberg were arrested on suspicion of violent public disorder, and one counter-demonstrator was arrested on suspicion of attacking a police officer. Swedish Jews were outraged at the demonstration, which took place on the Jewish holiday of Yom Kippur and was originally planned to pass near a synagogue. The march was re-routed and shortened following a court ruling.

On 19 April 2018, fireworks were thrown at the U.S. embassy in Stockholm during a protest against the bombing of Syria. One NRM man was arrested. The same month a member was arrested for plotting to assassinate journalists. Police confiscated a shotgun from the man. On 6 July 2018, members of the NRM assaulted two pro-Israel activists in Gotland.

On 6 July 2022, during Almedalen Week, Ing-Marie Wieselgren died after being stabbed at Donners plats in Visby. The arrested perpetrator was a 33-year-old man who had previously participated in events organized by the neo-Nazi Nordic Resistance Movement and had written for the neo-Nazi newspaper Nordfront.

In May 2022 the Swedish police arrested a man from Falköping for possessing firearms and powerful explosives. The police allege the man plotted mass shooting and bombing. According to Vice News the man possessed material by NRM, Iron March and Atomwaffen Division.

Electoral results

Riksdag

European Parliament

Nordic Strength 
Nordic Strength is an underground paramilitary group, formed in August 2019 by the most hard-line NRM members who reject the parliamentary oriented mass organization strategy of the Swedish group as an insufficiently radical approach. The group describes itself as a "fighting organization" ("kamporganisation") and maintains very strict physical standards for its members. The members of the group have been convicted of over 100 violent crimes and weapon offenses and use an old church in Västmanland as their headquarters. Virtually nothing else is known about the underground sect of the already secretive group.

Finland
Pohjoismainen Vastarintaliike is the Finnish branch of the Nordic Resistance Movement. It was founded by Esa Henrik Holappa, who would later abandon neo-Nazism and leave the group. Its current leader is Antti Niemi. Some of the group's activities include planting of propaganda posters and organizing demonstrations. Members also participate in hand-to-hand combat and shooting training arranged by the organization. The group also advocates pan-Finno-Ugrism, or "Kindred-folk ideology" ("Heimoaate"), and unification with ethnically Finnic Estonia is part of the group's program.

The organisation is responsible for multiple violent crimes, including attacking anti-racism and gay pride demonstrations and stabbing participants of a left-wing event. According to an investigation by Yleisradio, two thirds of the members have a conviction for a violent crime. The NRM is responsible for killing an antifascist activist in 2016 in Helsinki. The group also awarded the title of "activist of the year" to a member convicted of torturing a man to death and possessing illegal weapons. The group assaults people they consider political enemies in their homes, a practice they dub "home visits". In 2020 a campaign chairman was left critically injured after being beaten with a clawhammer in his home in Jämsä. A man connected to the group is charged with attempted murder along with another man. The NRM also vandalized the Israeli embassy over 20 times and defaced synagogues, causing the Finnish ambassador to be called to the Israeli foreign ministry in Jerusalem twice. On 5 December 2020 Finnish police arrested a NRM member for murdering a fellow member, this time in Riihimäki. On 17 March 2021 Finnish police arrested another NRM member and confiscated several crates of explosives from his apartment.

The NRM along with other nationalist organizations organizes an annual torch march demonstration in Helsinki on the Finnish independence day, which ends at the Hietaniemi cemetery where members visit the tomb of Carl Gustaf Emil Mannerheim and the monument to the Finnish SS Battalion. The event has been protested by antifascists, which has led to counterdemonstrators being violently assaulted by the NRM members who act as security. The demonstration attracts close to 3000 participants according to the estimates of the police and hundreds of officers patrol Helsinki to prevent violent clashes. The march has been attended and promoted by the Finns Party, and condemned by left-wing parties, for example Green League MP Iiris Suomela characterized it as "obviously neo-nazi" and expressed her disappointment in it being attended by such a large number of people. The event also attracts neo-nazis from abroad and has been attended by the NRM's foreign allies like Junge Nationalisten, who praised the event and compared it to the Battle of Helsinki, "when Germans and Finns marched side by side and liberated the city from the communists".

In addition to violent crimes, the NRM is closely connected to the proscribed terrorist organization National Action. A Finnish corporal who had served in Afghanistan and was a member of both the NRM and National Action was convicted of terror offenses and membership in the proscribed organization while living in Llansilin. The leader of National Action, Benjamin Raymond, also visited the NRM in Finland and held speeches and was pictured posing with an assault rifle. The NRM also cooperates with the neo-Nazi military formation Azov Battalion according to Yle. Dozens of the Finns are also part of the Iron March terror network, famous for spawning the Atomwaffen Division. The group distributes the magazine Musta Kivi advocating Esoteric Hitlerism and the Order of Nine Angles and sells books by Savitri Devi and ONA adept Kerry Bolton of the Black Order. It also promotes and sells Siege by James Mason that exhorts accelerationism and terrorism. Representatives of the NRM visited James Mason in the United States in 2019 with a touring NRM-affiliated Finnish neo-Nazi music collective, "Bolt of Ukko" (Ukonvasama).

Even though the NRM rejects parliamentarism unlike the Swedish branch, there have been numerous cases where members of the Finns Party have attracted criticism from the other parties and antifascists for attending events organized by or with the NRM. Several members of the Finns Party took part in an event where the participants shot and threw knives at targets, using photos of members of the Rinne Cabinet and attended an event commemorating Eugen Schauman, who assassinated Nikolay Bobrikov. Finns Party Youth members and leaders also attend "Etnofutur" ethnonationalist conferences in Estonia organized by the Blue Awakening together with the NRM. The founder of Blue Awakening and current MP for EKRE Ruuben Kaalep has been described as a neo-nazi and connected to the local proscribed terror group and Atomwaffen affiliate Feuerkrieg Division.

On 30 November 2017, the Pirkanmaa District Court banned the Nordic Resistance Movement in Finland for having "flagrantly violated the principles of good practice". The ban was appealed and a request by the police for a temporary ban was turned down. In September 2018 the Court of appeal in Turku upheld the ban. In March 2019, the Supreme Court placed a temporary ban on the group. On 22 September 2020, the Supreme Court upheld the ban. The Supreme Court noted in its ruling that "The use of violence linked to the organization's activities has to be considered a part of the organization's operations...The operating methods that were considered unlawful represented a substantial part of the organization's operations, and [the organization] only engaged in a limited amount of other types of activities".

The National Bureau of Investigation suspects the Nordic Resistance Movement to be continuing its operations under the names Kohti Vapautta!, Atomwaffen Division Finland and Suomalaisapu. In its annual threat assessment for 2020, the bureau found that despite the ban, the threat of far-right terrorism had risen and identified 400 persons of interest "motivated and with the capacity to perform terrorism in Finland". International links and funding networks were pointed out as a special source of concern. According to the University of Oslo Center for Research on Extremism:

some NRM activists have reasoned that only radical measures will be effective post-ban, thus coming to support e.g. the accelerationist model of activity. Certain members of the group have also appeared as contributors to publications that promote esoteric forms of neo-Nazism. A corresponding shift towards a more “cultic” direction has also been observed in the United Kingdom after the banning of the National Action (NA).

Norway
Nordiske Motstandsbevegelsen is the Norwegian chapter of the Nordic Resistance Movement, founded by Haakon Forwald, former member of Dissection and Misanthropic Luciferian Order. They are organized in four subchapters (or nests) in Norway. In 2014 Norwegian police confiscated illegal submachine guns and automatic rifles from a member. In 2019, another member was arrested after hijacking an ambulance, trying to ram a police car and driving into a crowd. Inside the ambulance the police discovered a shotgun and Uzi submachine gun.

Iceland
There have been a few newspaper articles on ties of the movement to Iceland, and it has a website under Icelandic domain.

In September 2019 between 10 and 15 Swedish members of the Nordic Resistance Movement staged an event at Lækjartorg in Reykjavík where they spread flyers and promoted the organisation. The event sparked an anti-Nazi demonstration a few days later which drew an estimated crowd of 200 participants.

In September 2022, the Icelandic police raided several safe houses for Nordic neo-Nazis and confiscated automatic rifles. The police also arrested four neo-Nazis connected to the NRM, accused of planning terror attacks.

Denmark
Nordiske Modstandsbevægelse is the Danish branch of the Nordic Resistance Movement and it is led by Jacob Vullum Andersen. In 2019 on the anniversary of the Kristallnacht a jewish graveyard was vandalized by Danish NRM members in the town of Randers. In 2021 on the Passover a Jewish graveyard was vandalized in the city of Aalborg. Benny Dagan, Israeli ambassador to Denmark, commented “Strongly condemn this anti-Semitic act in Aalborg using the infamous blood libel of murdering Christian children and baking matzos with their blood. I have full confidence that Danish authorities [will] punish the perpetrators, but Nazi Nordfront has to be outlawed.”

See also

 Kohti Vapautta!
 The III. Path
 Terrorgram, accelerationist network
 Tiwaz (rune), a symbol incorporated into the flag

Notes

References

Citations

General sources 

 

1997 establishments in Sweden
Accelerationism
Banned far-right parties
Crimes involving Satanism or the occult
Minor political parties in Sweden
Neo-Nazism in Denmark
Neo-Nazism in Finland
Neo-Nazism in Sweden
Neo-Nazi political parties in Europe
Neo-Nazism in Norway
Organizations established in 1997
Organizations that oppose LGBT rights
Political parties established in 2015
Politics and race
Satanism and Nazism
Terrorism in Sweden
Terrorism in Finland